Pseudagrion gamblesi is a species of damselfly in the family Coenagrionidae. It is found in Angola, Botswana, Ethiopia, Kenya, Malawi, South Africa, Tanzania, Uganda, Zambia, Zimbabwe, and possibly Burundi. Its natural habitats are subtropical or tropical streams and rivers with reeds.

References

External links

 Pseudagrion gamblesi on African Dragonflies and Damselflies Online

Coenagrionidae
Insects described in 1978
Taxonomy articles created by Polbot